The 2021–22 Dixie State Trailblazers men's basketball team represented Dixie State University in the 2021–22 NCAA Division I men's basketball season. The Trailblazers, led by 17th-year head coach Jon Judkins, played their home games at Burns Arena in St. George, Utah as members of the Western Athletic Conference (WAC).

The 2021–22 season was Dixie State's second year of a four-year transition period from Division II to Division I. As a result, the Trailblazers were not eligible for NCAA postseason play and could not participate in the WAC tournament. However, they were eligible to play in the CIT or CBI, if invited.

This was also Dixie State's final season under that name; the school changed its name to Utah Tech University effective with the 2022–23 school year. The Trailblazers nickname is not affected.

Previous season
The Trailblazers finished the 2020–21 season 8-13 overall, and 4-10 in WAC play. The season was Dixie's worst as an institution at the NCAA level, and first losing season since 2007-08. However, 6 contests were canceled due to the COVID-19 pandemic.

Offseason

Coaching changes

Departures

Additions to staff

Player departures

Incoming transfers

Roster

Schedule and results

|-
!colspan=12 style=| Non-conference regular season

|-
!colspan=12 style=| WAC regular season

|-

Source

See also 
2021–22 Dixie State Trailblazers women's basketball team

References

Utah Tech Trailblazers men's basketball seasons
Dixie State
Dixie State Trailblazers men's basketball
Dixie State Trailblazers men's basketball